A rogue wave is an abnormally large ocean wave.

Rogue wave may also refer to:
 Optical rogue waves, are rare pulses of light analogous to rogue or freak ocean waves.
 Rogue Wave Software, a software company
 Rogue Wave (band), an American indie rock band
 "Rogue Wave", a song by American progressive rock band The Hsu-nami
 ”Rogue Wave”, a song by American rapper and producer Aesop Rock
 “Rogue Wave”, a short story by Theodore Taylor (author)